This is a list of airports in Turkey, sorted by location.

Airports

See also

 List of the busiest airports in Turkey
 List of Turkish Air Force bases and airfields
 Transport in Turkey
 List of airports by ICAO code: L#LT – Turkey
 List of airports in Ankara

References

  Devlet Hava Meydanları İşletmesi (DHMİ) (State Airports Authority)

External links
 Lists of airports in Turkey:
 Great Circle Mapper
 FallingRain.com
 Aircraft Charter World
 Türkiye Havaalanları (Turkish)
 The Airport Guide
 World Aero Data
 ATM Dalaman International Airport

 
 
Turkey
Turkey
Turkey